Wessyngton may refer to:

Washington, Tyne and Wear, in England, which might have been termed "Wessyngton" sometime
Wessyngton (Cedar Hill, Tennessee), a historic mansion listed on the U.S. National Register of Historic Places

See also
Wessington, Derbyshire, England, a village and civil parish
Wessington, South Dakota, a town